Lindsey Bluffs is a ridge in the U.S. state of Wisconsin.

Lindsey Bluffs takes its name from the community of Lindsey, Wisconsin, which in turn has the name of F. D. Lindsey, a businessperson in the lumber industry.

References

Landforms of Wood County, Wisconsin
Ridges of the United States